Jean-Marie Fiévet (born 19 June 1964 in Bressuire) is a French politician representing La République En Marche! He was elected to the French National Assembly on 18 June 2017, representing the 3rd constituency of Deux-Sèvres. He is a professional fireman, lieutenant.

See also
 2017 French legislative election

References

1964 births
Living people
Deputies of the 15th National Assembly of the French Fifth Republic
La République En Marche! politicians
French firefighters
Deputies of the 16th National Assembly of the French Fifth Republic